The Tradeston Bridge (colloquially known as the squiggly bridge) is a pedestrian bridge across the River Clyde in Glasgow which opened on 14 May 2009.  It links the districts of Anderston (on the north bank) to Tradeston and the neighbouring district of Kingston (on the south bank) – the aim of the bridge being to aid the regeneration of Tradeston by giving it a direct link to the city's financial district on the western side of the city centre.

The design was prepared by Dissing+Weitling, a Danish architectural firm, with the UK engineers Halcrow Group. The bridge concrete works were built by BAM Nuttall whilst the steel bridge structure was fabricated and erected by RBG Ltd. The structure is a balanced cantilever design. The steel fins, which provide structural support, are placed above the bridge to add visual interest but also to reduce the overall bulk of the deck.

It cost £7 million to construct and is used by pedestrians and cyclists with no motorised traffic being allowed upon it. The span is horizontally curved in an S shape with outward canting on both curves. The S shape gives the bridge the extra length it needs to allow enough clearance for boats without making the bridge too steep.

References

External links
 Tradeston Bridge - Architect's page

Bridges in Glasgow
Bridges across the River Clyde
Bridges completed in 2009
Pedestrian bridges in Scotland
Gorbals
2009 establishments in Scotland